Robert Trewick Bone (24 September 1790 – 5 May 1840) was an English painter of sacred, classical and genre scenes. He was also an enamel painter.

Life and work
Bone was born in London, the son (and one of 10 surviving children) of Henry Bone, the celebrated enamel painter, who instructed him in art, and younger brother of Henry Pierce Bone (1779–1855), also an enamel painter.

He first exhibited at the Royal Academy in 1813, and again in 1815, but stopped after 1838. In 1817 he won a premium of £100 from the British Institution for his painting of A lady with her attendants at the bath. He does not appear to have done much in enamel painting, but confined himself almost exclusively to sacred, classic, and domestic subjects. His works, though generally small, are tasteful and sparkling, and he was a member of the Sketching Club.

Bone died from the effects of an accident on 5 May 1840.

References

Attribution:

External links

Robert Trewick Bone on Artnet
Catalogue for R. T. Bone (Royal Academy collections)
Girl Holding a Kitten (Christie's)
Prints by R. T. Bone (British Museum collection)

1790 births
1840 deaths
19th-century English painters
English male painters
British genre painters
Portrait miniaturists
19th-century English male artists